Meriläinen is the surname of the following people
Antti Meriläinen (1887-1942), Finnish politician
Matti Meriläinen (1889-1963), Finnish politician
Mikko Meriläinen (born in 1927), Finnish skier 
Pekka Meriläinen (1886-1926), Finnish politician
Rosa Meriläinen (born in 1975), Finnish politician
Usko Meriläinen (1930-2004), Finnish composer